Carden is a surname. Notable people with the surname include:

Alan Douglas Carden (1874–1964), English soldier in the Royal Engineers, pioneer aviator
Billy Carden (1924–2004), NASCAR Grand National driver from Mableton, Georgia, USA
Cap R. Carden (1866–1935), member of the US House of Representatives
Carden Gillenwater (1918–2000), Major League Baseball center fielder
D’Arcy Carden, American actress
Dan Carden (born 1986), British Labour Party politician
David L. Carden, U.S. Ambassador and attorney
George Frederick Carden (1798–1874), English barrister, magazine editor and businessman, founder of Kensal Green Cemetery
Henry Carden (1882–1964), English priest, Archdeacon of Lahore
Joan Carden (born 1937), Australian operatic soprano
Sir John Carden, 6th Baronet (1892–1935), English tank and vehicle designer
John Carden (baseball) (1921–1949), Major League Baseball pitcher
John Surman Carden (1771–1858), British Royal Navy officer
John Carden (soccer) (1931–1997), member of the U.S. soccer team at the 1956 Summer Olympics
Sir Lionel Carden (1851–1915), British ambassador
Macky Carden (born 1944), American football coach
Mae Carden (1894–1977), American educator
Mike Carden, member of American rock band The Academy Is... 2003–11
Paul Carden (born 1979), English footballer and coach
Sir Robert Carden (1801–1888) British banker and politician
Sir Sackville Carden (1857–1930), Royal Navy admiral
Shane Carden (born 1991), American football player

See also 
 Cardan (disambiguation)

English-language surnames
Surnames of English origin
Surnames of British Isles origin

fr:Carden